Betty Jane Bierce, better known by her stage name Jane "Poni" Adams (August 7, 1918 – May 21, 2014), was an American actress in radio, film, and television in the 1940s and 1950s.

Early years 
The daughter of Mr. and Mrs. Mason Bierce, Adams was born in San Antonio, Texas, but her family moved to California when she was two. During her high school years, she studied violin and drama, and she was selected to be a concert mistress of the all-city high school orchestra of Los Angeles. She received a full scholarship to Juilliard, which she turned down to spend years studying at the Pasadena Playhouse.

Acting career
After the Playhouse, she got her start on Lux Radio Theatre and then with the Harry Conover Modeling Agency, where she was given her nickname "Poni". This was supposedly due to her love of horses, but in reality it was to provide her with a more memorable stage name. (In the book Westerns Women: Interviews with 50 Leading Ladies of Movie and Television Westerns from the 1930s to the 1960s, Adams said: "I was given that name at the Harry Conover Modeling Agency. Why, I don't know!) She returned to using her real name in 1945.

Military personnel played a role in her change of names from Poni Adams to Jane Adams. A photograph printed in newspapers in 1946 carried the caption: "GI JANE — Jane Adams — formerly Poni Adams — holds some of 32,851 letters her press agent said came from GIs after she appealed for aid in choosing a new name."

Adams' first screen appearance was in  So You Want to Give Up Smoking, a short film in 1942. She may be best known for her role as Nina in House of Dracula (1945), but she also has the distinction of acting in early adaptations of both major DC Comics franchises: Batman, where she played Vicki Vale in the second Batman serial, Batman and Robin, and also a character in the first Superman television series.

Personal life and death
On July 27, 1940, Adams married Ensign J.C.H. Smith, a United States Navy officer, in Norfolk, Virginia. He was declared dead on September 15, 1943, in Hawaii, after becoming missing in action during World War II when his ship sank a year earlier.

On July 14, 1945, in Hollywood, California, she married Thomas K. Turnage, an Army lieutenant who went on to become a decorated major general. Turnage served in the Korean War and earned the Distinguished Service Medal and Bronze Star. He later served as the last administrator of the Veterans Administration before the VA became a cabinet department during Ronald Reagan's presidential term. Adams and Turnage had two children.

On May 21, 2014, Adams died in Bellingham, Washington, at the age of 95. She was buried (as Betty Jane Turnage) beside her husband in Arlington National Cemetery.

References

External links

1918 births
2014 deaths
American film actresses
American television actresses
American radio actresses
Actresses from San Antonio
20th-century American actresses
Burials at Arlington National Cemetery
21st-century American actresses